Frederick Jay Rubin (born March 10, 1963) is an American record executive and record producer. He is the co-founder (alongside Russell Simmons) of Def Jam Recordings, founder of American Recordings, and former co-president of Columbia Records.

Rubin helped popularise hip hop by producing records for acts such as the Beastie Boys, Geto Boys, Run-DMC, Public Enemy, and LL Cool J. He has also produced hit records for acts from a variety of other genres, predominantly heavy metal (Danzig, Metallica and Slayer), alternative rock (the Cult, Red Hot Chili Peppers, the Strokes and Weezer), hard rock (Audioslave and Aerosmith), nu-metal (Linkin Park, Rage Against the Machine, System of a Down), and country (Johnny Cash and the Chicks).

In 2007, Rubin was called "the most important producer of the last 20 years" by MTV and was named on Time list of the "100 Most Influential People in the World".

His debut book, The Creative Act: A Way of Being, was published in January 2023.

Early life
Frederick Jay Rubin was born into a Jewish family in Long Beach, New York, on March 10, 1963, the son of housewife Linda and shoe wholesaler Michael Rubin. He grew up in Lido Beach, New York. While a student at Long Beach High School, he befriended the school's audiovisual department director, who gave him a few lessons in guitar playing and songwriting. He then played in a band with three friends, performing at garage gigs and school shows until a teacher helped him create a punk band called the Pricks. Their biggest claim to fame was being thrown off the stage at CBGB after performing two songs due to brawling with hecklers, which had actually been instigated by friends of the band who had been instructed to do so to get the show shut down and create a buzz. Although he had no authority in New York City, Rubin's father travelled to Manhattan wearing his Long Beach auxiliary police uniform as he attempted to "shut down" the show.

Career

Def Jam 
During his senior year of high school, Rubin founded Def Jam Recordings using the school's four-track recorder. He moved on to form the band Hose, influenced by San Francisco's Flipper. In 1982, a Hose track became Def Jam's first release, a 45 rpm 7" vinyl single in a brown paper bag, and no label. The band played in and around the NYC punk scene, toured the Midwest and California, and played with seminal hardcore bands like Meat Puppets, Hüsker Dü, Circle Jerks, Butthole Surfers, and Minor Threat, becoming friends with Fugazi frontman and Dischord Records owner Ian MacKaye. The band broke up in 1984 as Rubin's passion moved towards the NYC hip hop scene.

Having befriended Zulu Nation's DJ Jazzy Jay, Rubin began to learn about hip hop production. By 1983, the two had produced "It's Yours" for Bronx rapper T La Rock, and released it on Def Jam. Producer Arthur Baker helped to distribute the record worldwide on Baker's Streetwise Records in 1984. Jazzy Jay introduced Rubin to concert promoter/artist manager Russell Simmons in the Negril club, and Rubin explained he needed help getting Def Jam off the ground. Simmons and Rubin edged out Jazzy Jay and the official Def Jam record label was founded while Rubin was attending New York University in 1984. Their first record released was LL Cool J's "I Need a Beat". Rubin went on to find more hip-hop acts outside the Bronx, Brooklyn, and Harlem including rappers from Queens, Staten Island, and Long Island, which eventually led to Def Jam's signing of Public Enemy. Rubin was instrumental in pointing the members of the Beastie Boys away from their punk roots and into rap, resulting in the exit of Kate Schellenbach from the group. 1985's "Rock Hard"/"Party's Gettin' Rough"/"Beastie Groove" EP by the Beastie Boys came out on the success of Rubin's production work with breakthrough act Run-DMC, of which previous recordings were produced by Russell Simmons and Orange Krush's musician Larry Smith. His productions were characterised by occasionally fusing rap with heavy rock. Rubin tapped Adam Dubin and Ric Menello to co-direct the music videos for the Beastie Boys' "(You Gotta) Fight for Your Right (To Party!)" and "No Sleep till Brooklyn", effectively launching the band's mainstream hip hop careers.

It was the idea of Rubin's friend Sue Cummings, an editor at Spin magazine, to have Run-DMC and Aerosmith collaborate on a cover of Aerosmith's "Walk This Way". This 1986 production is often credited with both introducing rap hard rock to mainstream ears and revitalising Aerosmith's career. In 1986, he worked with Aerosmith again on demos for their forthcoming album, but their collaboration ended early and resulted in only rough studio jams. In the same year, Rubin began his long musical partnership with Slayer, producing Reign in Blood, considered a classic of the heavy metal genre. This was his first work with a metal band.

In 1987, the Cult released their pivotal third album, Electric. Produced by Rubin, the album remains one of the Cult's trademark and classic works. Rubin would later work with the Cult again for the single "The Witch", in 1992. Rubin is credited as music supervisor for the film Less than Zero and as the producer of its soundtrack. Rubin portrayed a character based on himself in the 1985 hip-hop motion picture Krush Groove, which was inspired by the early days of Russell Simmons' career as an artist management and music producer. He then directed and co-wrote (with Ric Menello) a second Run–D.M.C. film, Tougher Than Leather in 1988.

In 1988, Rubin and Simmons went their separate ways after Rubin had a falling out with the then Def Jam president Lyor Cohen. Rubin left for Los Angeles to start Def American Records, while Simmons remained at Def Jam in New York. In Los Angeles, Rubin signed a number of rock and heavy metal acts, including Danzig, Masters of Reality, the Four Horsemen, and Wolfsbane, as well as alternative rock group the Jesus and Mary Chain and stand-up comedian Andrew Dice Clay. Though Rubin's work at this time focused mainly on rock and metal, he still retained a close association with rap, signing the Geto Boys and continuing to work with Public Enemy, LL Cool J, and Run-DMC.

American Recordings 
Rubin had originally given his new label the name "Def American Recordings". In 1993 Rubin found that the word "def" had been accepted into the standardised dictionary and held an actual funeral for the word, complete with a casket, a grave, celebrity mourners and a eulogy from Al Sharpton. Def American became American Recordings. In regard to this he stated: "When advertisers and the fashion world co-opted the image of hippies, a group of the original hippies in San Francisco literally buried the image of the hippie. When 'def' went from street lingo to mainstream, it defeated its purpose."

The first major project on the renamed label was Johnny Cash's American Recordings (1994), a record including six cover songs and new material written by others for Cash at Rubin's request. The album was a critical and commercial success, and helped revive Cash's career following a fallow period. The formula was repeated for five more Cash albums: Unchained (on which Tom Petty and the Heartbreakers served as the backing band), Solitary Man, The Man Comes Around (the last album released before Cash's death), A Hundred Highways, and Ain't No Grave. The Man Comes Around earned a 2003 Grammy for Best Male Country Vocal Performance ("Give My Love to Rose") and a nomination for Best Country Collaboration with Vocals ("Bridge over Troubled Water" with Fiona Apple). Rubin introduced Cash to Nine Inch Nails' "Hurt", and the resulting cover version of it on The Man Comes Around would become a defining song of Cash's later years. Rubin also produced two of Joe Strummer's final songs, "Long Shadow", a song Strummer wrote for Cash to record although he never did, and a cover of Bob Marley's "Redemption Song". Both songs were released on Strummer's final album, Streetcore, which was released after his death. Rubin also produced a version of "Redemption Song" with Strummer and Cash together, which was featured in Cash's posthumous box set, Unearthed.

Rubin has also produced a number of records with other artists, which were released on labels other than American. Arguably his biggest success as producer came from working with the Red Hot Chili Peppers with whom Rubin produced six studio albums from 1991 to 2011, starting with the band's fifth release, Blood Sugar Sex Magik, which launched the band to mainstream success thanks to the hit singles "Give It Away" and "Under the Bridge". Other albums include One Hot Minute, Californication, By the Way, Stadium Arcadium and I'm With You.  The six albums with the Chili Peppers also spawned 12 number one singles on the Billboard Alternative Songs chart, a record the band as of 2015 still holds, and various awards including 16 Grammy Nominations (with six wins) with a Producer of the Year Grammy award for 2006's Stadium Arcadium, which was also nominated for Album of the Year. The band has sold over 80 million albums worldwide, most of which have been through sales of the Rubin-produced albums. Various members of the Chili Peppers have also been used on other projects by Rubin, John Frusciante featured on Johnny Cash and Chad Smith featured on the Dixie Chicks.  After 24 years of working with Rubin, the band announced in late 2014 that they would be working with Danger Mouse on their eleventh studio album. However, Rubin returned to the role of producer for the band's two albums released in 2022, seven months apart from one another: Unlimited Love and Return of the Dream Canteen.  Again these two albums both featured no.1 singles on the Alternative Songs chart.

He also produced Mick Jagger's 1993 Wandering Spirit album, Lords of Acid's 1994 Voodoo-U album, Tom Petty's 1994 Wildflowers, AC/DC's 1995 Ballbreaker, Donovan's 1996 Sutras, System of a Down's 1998 System of a Down, and Metallica's 2008 Death Magnetic. In 2005, Rubin executive-produced Shakira's two-album project Fijacion Oral Vol. 1 and Oral Fixation Vol. 2. He was to appear on the Talib Kweli's album Eardrum, Clipse's album Til the Casket Drops and Lil Jon's album Crunk Rock. Rubin also produced the Jay-Z track "99 Problems", and was featured in the song's music video. He also worked with Eminem on the song and music video "Berzerk".

Rubin produced Black Sabbath's 2013 album 13 and Billy Corgan's comeback solo album Ogilala.

Columbia 
In May 2007, Rubin was named co-head of Columbia Records. Rubin co-produced Linkin Park's 2007 album Minutes to Midnight with Mike Shinoda. Rubin and Shinoda have since co-produced the band's 2010 album, A Thousand Suns, and their 2012 release, Living Things.

In 2007, Rubin won the Grammy Award for Producer of the Year, Non-Classical for his work with the Chicks. Michael Kranz, Red Hot Chili Peppers, U2, Green Day, and Johnny Cash released in 2006  Rubin won the award again in 2009, for production work for Metallica, Neil Diamond, Ours, Jakob Dylan, and Weezer in 2008.

In 2007 and 2012, Rubin won the Grammy Award for Album of the Year. The former was for his work on the Chicks album Taking the Long Way and the latter came for his contribution to Adele's album 21.

Post-Columbia 
Rubin left Columbia in 2012, and revived the American Recordings imprint through a deal with Republic Records. The first albums released under this new deal were ZZ Top's La Futura and the Avett Brothers' The Carpenter.

Rubin attempted to record a cover album with Crosby, Stills & Nash in 2012, but the brief sessions were ultimately unsuccessful. Graham Nash went on to describe the sessions as "irritable" and "not a great experience".

In July 2021, Rubin signed with Endeavor Content to further develop his home studio, Shangri-La Recording Studios.

Other work 
Rubin has a chapter giving advice in Tim Ferriss' book Tools of Titans, and often gives advice on creativity via his Instagram page.

Rubin was featured as one of Supreme's "photo tees" during their fall/winter 2021 season. The t-shirt came in seven different colors and featured Rubin in a meditative sitting position while wearing the brand's iconic box logo white t-shirt.

Rubin's debut book, published on January 17, 2023, by Penguin Press, is titled The Creative Act: A Way of Being. It is a nonfiction work about creativity. He said, "I set out to write a book about what to do to make a great work of art. Instead, it revealed itself to be a book on how to be."

Production style

Praise
Rubin's biggest trademark as a producer has been a "stripped-down" sound, which involves eliminating production elements such as string sections, backup vocals, and reverb, and instead having naked vocals and bare instrumentation. However, by the 2000s, Rubin's style had been known to include such elements, as noted in The Washington Post: "As the track reaches a crescendo and [Neil] Diamond's portentous baritone soars over a swelling string arrangement, Rubin leans back, as though floored by the emotional power of the song."

On the subject of his production methods, Dan Charnas, a music journalist who worked as vice president of A&R and marketing at Rubin's American Recordings label in the 1990s, said, "He's fantastic with sound and arrangements, and he's tremendous with artists. They love him. He shows them how to make it better, and he gets more honest and exciting performances out of people than anyone." Natalie Maines of the Chicks has praised his production methods, saying, "He has the ability and the patience to let music be discovered, not manufactured. Come to think of it, maybe he is a guru."  Producer Dr. Dre has stated that Rubin is "hands down, the dopest producer ever that anyone would ever want to be, ever".

Criticism
At the 2010 Music Producers Guild Awards, Muse frontman Matt Bellamy criticised Rubin while accepting the award for UK Single of the Year by stating, "We'd like to thank Rick Rubin for teaching us how not to produce."

In 2014, Slipknot frontman Corey Taylor said that he met Rubin only four times during the entire recording process of Vol. 3: (The Subliminal Verses): "We were being charged horrendous amounts of money. And for me, if you're going to produce something, you're fucking there. I don't care who you are! [...] The Rick Rubin of today is a shadow of the Rick Rubin that he was. He is overrated, he is overpaid, and I will never work with him again." In 2016, Taylor expressed regret and said he wanted to make amends with Rubin, attributing the friction to being "freshly sober [...] unsure of [himself]" and to never having previously worked with anyone whose methods were like Rubin's. In 2019, when comparing Rubin to Greg Fidelman (who had recently produced Slipknot's album We Are Not Your Kind), Taylor again criticised Rubin for his absences from the studio due to other work commitments. He said that Rubin was "a nice guy, absolutely nice guy" but claimed that "he just wasn't fucking there" and that the band did not see Rubin more than once a week until they finished recording the vocals at his house.

Loudness war
Since at least 1999, Rubin has been criticised by listeners for contributing to a phenomenon in music known as the loudness war, in which the dynamic range of recorded music is compressed and sometimes clipped in order to increase the general loudness. Albums produced by Rubin that have been criticised for such treatment include the following:

 Californication by the Red Hot Chili Peppers (1999) – Tim Anderson of The Guardian criticised its "excessive compression and distortion", and Stylus Magazine said it suffered from so much digital clipping that "even non-audiophile consumers complained about it".
 Death Magnetic by Metallica (2008) – some fans have preferred the Guitar Hero video game version of Death Magnetic, even though it was released for gameplay and not listening, because it was not subject to the same compression.
 13 by Black Sabbath (2013) – Ben Ratliff of The New York Times said, "The new Black Sabbath album was produced by Rick Rubin, who some believe to be a prime offender in the recent history of highly compressed and loudly mastered music – a major cause of ear fatigue ...  13 is mastered loudly, too ... Your ears aren't given room to breathe." Jon Hadusek of Consequence of Sound wrote, "Rubin ... deserves disparagement for the way he mixed the audio levels, which are crushed by distortion and compression. Otherwise well-recorded songs are blemished, an affliction all too pervasive in the modern music industry".

Personal life 
Rubin began dating former actress and model Mourielle Hurtado Herrera in 2010, and they were married at an unknown date. They have a son named Ra (born February 2017) and reside in Malibu, California.

Rubin was a vegan for over 20 years, but later began eating meat again. He is a fan of professional wrestling and held season tickets to WWE events at Madison Square Garden throughout the 1970s and 1980s. He has cited wrestlers Roddy Piper and Ric Flair as influences in his work, and has said that villainous wrestlers were hugely influential in the development of the Beastie Boys' public image. He financially backed wrestling promoter Jim Cornette's company Smoky Mountain Wrestling from 1991 to 1995.

Discography

Filmography

Awards and nominations

Grammy Awards

|-
|rowspan="2"|1996
|Wildflowers
|Best Rock Album
|
|-
|Himself
|Producer of the Year, Non-Classical
|
|-
|rowspan="1"|1998
|Unchained
|Best Country Album
|
|-
|rowspan="3"|2000
|Californication
|rowspan="2"|Best Rock Album
|
|-
|Echo
|
|-
|rowspan="2"|Himself
|rowspan="2"|Producer of the Year, Non-Classical
|
|-
|rowspan="2"|2003
|
|-
|American IV: The Man Comes Around
|Best Contemporary Folk Album
|
|-
|rowspan="2"|2005
|Unearthed
|Best Historical Album
|
|-
|"99 Problems"
|Best Rap Song
|
|-
|rowspan="7"|2007
|"Not Ready to Make Nice"
|Record of the Year
|
|-
|rowspan="2"|Taking the Long Way
|Best Country Album
|
|-
|rowspan="3"|Album of the Year
|
|-
|FutureSex/LoveSounds
|
|-
|rowspan="2"|Stadium Arcadium
|
|-
|Best Rock Album
|
|-
|rowspan="2"|Himself
|rowspan="2"|Producer of the Year, Non-Classical
|
|-
|rowspan="1"|2009
|
|-
|rowspan="1"|2011
| "Ain't No Grave / The Johnny Cash Project"
|Best Short Form Music Video
|
|-
|rowspan="1"|2012
|21
|rowspan="2"|Album of the Year
|
|-
|rowspan="1"|2015
|x
|
|-
|rowspan="1"|2021
|The New Abnormal
|Best Rock Album
|
|-

References

External links 

 
 
 Originally from Mix Magazine

 
1963 births
American hip hop record producers
American music industry executives
Record producers from New York (state)
Beastie Boys members
Businesspeople from New York (state)
Grammy Award winners
Jewish American musicians
New York University alumni
People from Lido Beach, New York
Rap rock musicians
Jewish hip hop record producers
Def Jam Recordings
Guitarists from New York (state)
Living people
20th-century American guitarists
Long Beach High School (New York) alumni